Ekrem Sancaklı (born April 26, 2001) is a Turkish professional basketball player who plays as a shooting guard for Fenerbahçe Koleji of the Turkish Turkish Basketball Second League (TB2L).

References

External links
Ekrem Sancaklı Euroleague.net Profile
Ekrem Sancaklı TBLStat.net Profile
Ekrem Sancaklı Eurobasket Profile
Ekrem Sancaklı TBL Profile

Living people
2001 births
Afyonkarahisar Belediyespor players
Fenerbahçe men's basketball players
Shooting guards
Turkish men's basketball players